Mama Kandeh (born 12 July 1965) is a member of the Pan-African Parliament from the Gambia. He is the founding leader of the Gambia Democratic Congress (GDC) political party, which he formed in the summer of 2016. He ran as a candidate in the Gambian presidential election of 2016 and received 17.1% of the votes.

Background

He was formerly a member of the Alliance for Patriotic Reorientation and Construction, which was the ruling party at the time, but was expelled and formed the GDC.

He pulled 17.8 % of the votes in the Gambian presidential election of 2016.

In November 2021, Mama Kandeh's candidacy for the presidential election of 2021-22 is validated by the Independent Electoral Commission (CEI). He was endorsed by ex-President and former rival Yahya Jammeh.

References

Living people
1965 births
Members of the Pan-African Parliament from the Gambia
Place of birth missing (living people)
Leaders of political parties in the Gambia
Alliance for Patriotic Reorientation and Construction politicians